Makana Henry (born January 23, 1987) is a professional Canadian football defensive lineman for the Edmonton Elks of the Canadian Football League. He was signed to the Roughriders' roster in August 2016. He played junior football for the Burlington Braves of the Canadian Junior Football League (C.J.F.L.) in 2005–2009. Before being invited by the Roughriders, he played in semi-pro football for the GTA All Stars of the Northern Football Conference league in 2016. In November 2019, he was re-signed for an additional 2-year contract. Henry signed with the Edmonton Elks to open free agency on February 8, 2022.

Charitable activities 
Henry is very involved in the Saskatchewan community, especially with the students of Scott Collegiate. His troubled past helps him to bond with the students and to be a positive influence for them. In 2017, he was named Mosaic Community Player of the year and made a donation to Scott Collegiate. For three consecutive years (2017-2019), Henry has won the Roughriders’ Community Service Award.

References

External links

1987 births
Living people
Canadian football people from Toronto
Canadian football defensive linemen
Players of Canadian football from Ontario
Saskatchewan Roughriders players